Candlelight in Algeria is a 1944 British war film directed by George King and starring James Mason, Carla Lehmann and Raymond Lovell. The story is loosely based on an October 1942 secret conference in Cherchell, Algeria between American general Mark W. Clark and a group of high-ranking Vichy French commanders. At the conference, the Vichy French commanders agreed to not resist the Operation Torch landings in Vichy France-controlled French North Africa that occurred one month later.

Plot
Ahead of the conference, British agent Alan Thurston has been assigned to travel to Algiers to recover a camera containing photos that reveal where the meeting will take place. Thurston is not aware of the meeting or the content of the photos, but he has orders to prevent the camera from reaching the Germans. He is shadowed by German spy Dr. Müller, who intends to steal the camera as soon as Thurston acquires it.

Susan Foster, an American sculptress living in Biskra, agrees to help Thurston. In Algiers, she steals the camera from the bedroom of nightclub singer Martiza, but instead of giving the camera to Thurston, she plans to take it to the American consulate. However, her opinion of Thurston quickly changes when he rescues her from Müller. They take cover in a kasbah with Thurston’s French friend Yvette and develop the film there. After Thurston recognises the place in the photos, they race to the meeting place to warn the Allied officers.

Cast
James Mason as Alan Thurston
Carla Lehmann as Susan Foster
Raymond Lovell as von Alven
Enid Stamp Taylor as Maritza
Walter Rilla as Dr. Müller
Pamela Stirling as Yvette
Lea Seidl as Sister
Sybille Binder as Woman
Hella Kürty as Maid
Paul Bonifas as French Proprietor
Leslie Bradley as Henri de Lange
Harold Berens as Toni
Cot D'Ordan as Hotel Manager
Richard George as Capt. Matthews
Meinhart Maur as Schultz
Jacques Metadier as Elderly French Officer
Michael Morel as Police Commissioner
Bart Norman as Gen. Mark W. Clark
Richard Molinas as French Sergeant
MacDonald Parke as American
Graham Penley as Pierre
John Slater as American Officer
Paul Sheridan as Plainclothes Detective
Robert Berkeley as Commando Officer
Albert Whelan as Kadour
Cecile Chevreau as Nun
Christiane De Maurin as Singer
Eric L'Epine Smith as Bit Role

Reception
The film premiered at the Regal, Marble Arch in London on 18 February 1944, but the reviewer for The Times was somewhat disappointed: "Candlelight in Algeria is not the film it might have been with such a theme to inspire it; it shows itself aware of the possibilities, but fails to exploit them."

When the film opened at the Victoria Theater in New York City on 29 July 1944, The New York Times critic Paul P. Kennedy was somewhat more forgiving: "The British Lion production which came to the Victoria Saturday is, as a whole, well put together, and the acting, while not outstanding, is worthy of the film. Add to this the mysterious background of Algiers and a lot of international intrigue and the result is a generally entertaining picture."

According to trade papers, the film was a success at the British box office in 1944.

References

External links
 
 
 
 

1944 films
World War II spy films
World War II films made in wartime
1940s English-language films
Films set in 1942
Films set in Algeria
Films set in Tunisia
Films directed by George King
Films scored by Jack Beaver
British black-and-white films
British war films
1940s war films
British Lion Films films
1940s British films